Martial Gayant (born 16 November 1962 in Chauny) is a former French cyclist, now a team captain of . In 1988, Gayant came second in the World road Championships.

Major results
Source:

1981
 GP des Nations, amateurs
1984
 Giro d'Italia: stage 10
1985
 Paris–Camembert
1986
 GP Ouest France-Plouay
 French national champion field riding
1987
 Four Days of Dunkirk: Stage 4
 Tour de France: Stage 11
1989
 Grand Prix de Fourmies
1990
 Tour de l'Avenir: Stage 8
 Tour de Limousin

Tours de France 
Source:
1985 – outside time limit on stage 15
1987 – 34th; winner of 11th stage, wearing the yellow jersey for 2 days
1988 – 71st
1989 – 32nd
1991 – withdrew on stage 6

References 

1962 births
Living people
French male cyclists
French Tour de France stage winners
French Giro d'Italia stage winners
Sportspeople from Aisne
Cyclists from Hauts-de-France
20th-century French people